Lycyaena is an extinct genus of terrestrial carnivore in the family Hyaenidae.
Lycyaena was a cursorial hunting hyaena as opposed to full-time scavenger. It has been suggested by R. F. Ewer that Lycyaena may be a possible ancestor to today's aardwolf (Proteles cristatus).

References

Miocene feliforms
Prehistoric mammals of Europe
Prehistoric carnivoran genera
Prehistoric hyenas